Federal Hill is a 1994 American drama film.

External links

1994 films
American black-and-white films
1990s crime drama films
Films shot in Rhode Island
Films set in Rhode Island
American crime drama films
1994 drama films
1995 drama films
1995 films
Films directed by Michael Corrente
1990s American films
1994 directorial debut films